Kala) is a Sanskrit term that means "time" or "death." As time personified, destroying all things, Kala is a god of death, and often used as one of the epithets of Yama. In Shaivism, Kala is known as the fiery avatar of Shiva Kala Bhairava or Kalagni Rudra; and in Vaishnavism Kala is also associated with Narasimha and Pralaya.

Etymology
Monier-Williams's widely used Sanskrit-English dictionary lists two distinct words with the form :
  1 means "black, of a dark colour, dark-blue ..." and has a feminine form ending in  –  – as mentioned in  4–1, 42. 
As a traditional Hindu unit of time, one kālá corresponds to 144 seconds.

According to Monier-Williams,  2 is from the verbal root   "to calculate", while the root of  1 is uncertain, though possibly the same.

Deity

Epics and the Puranas 
Kala appears as an impersonal deity within the Mahabharata, the Ramayana, and the Bhagavata Purana. In the Mahabharata, Krishna, one of the main characters, reveals his identity as Time personified. He states to Arjuna that both sides on the battlefield of the Kurukshetra War have already been annihilated. At the end of the epic, the entire Yadu dynasty (Krishna's dynasty) is similarly annihilated.

Kala appears in the Uttara Kanda of the Ramayana, as the messenger of Death (Yama). At the end of the story, Time, in the form of inevitability or necessity, informs Rama that his reign on Earth is now over. By a trick or dilemma, he forces the death of Lakshmana, and informs Rama that he must return to the realm of the gods. Lakshmana willingly passes away with Rama's blessing and Rama returns to Vaikuntha.

Time appears in the Bhagavata Purana as the force that is responsible for the imperceptible and inevitable change in the entire creation. According to the Purana, all created things are illusory, and thereby subject to creation and annihilation, this imperceptible and inconceivable impermanence is said to be due to the march of Time. Similarly, Time is considered to be the unmanifest aspect of God that remains after the destruction of the entire world at the end of a lifespan of Brahma. According to Soifer, Narasimha is explicitly linked with Pralaya or Yuganta itself in Bhagavata Purana, Linga Purana, and Kurma Purana versions; he is said to appear like Kala or the fire of destruction, both agents of Pralaya. 

In the Chaitanya Bhagavata, a Gaudiya Vaishnava text and biography of Chaitanya Mahaprabhu, it is said that the fire that emerges from the mouth of Sankarshana at the End of Time is the Kālānala, or "fire of Time". One of the names of Sankarshana is kālāgni, also "fire of time".

The Vishnu Purana also states that Time (kala) is one of the four primary forms of Vishnu, the others being matter (Pradhana), visible substance (vyakta), and Spirit (Purusha). According to Pinchman, "It is said that at the time of primordial creation, three forms arise from Vishnu: time (kala), purusha, and prakrti".

Bhagavad Gita
At Bhagavad Gita 11.32, Krishna takes on the form of kāla, the destroyer, announcing to Arjuna that all the warriors on both sides will be killed, apart from the Pandavas:

कालो ऽस्मि लोकक्षयकृत् प्रवृद्धो लोकान् समाहर्तुम् इह प्रवृत्तः ।
This verse means: "Time (kāla) I am, the great destroyer of the worlds, and I have come here to destroy all people." This phrase is famous for being quoted by J. Robert Oppenheimer as he reflected on the Manhattan Project's explosion of the first nuclear bomb in 1945.

In other cultures
In Javanese mythology, Batara Kala is the god of destruction.  It is a very huge mighty and powerful god depicted as giant, born of the sperm of Shiva, the kings of gods.

In Borobudur, the gate to the stairs is adorned with a giant head, making the gate look like the open mouth of the giant. Many other gates in Javanese traditional buildings have this kind of ornament. Perhaps the most detailed Kala Face in Java is on the south side of Candi Kalasan.

In Thailand, he is popular worshipped together with Lak Mueang within Tai folk religion and Chitragupta in Hinduism.

Jainism 

In Jainism, Kāla (Time) is infinite and is explained in two different ways:
 The measure of duration, known in the form of hours, days, like that.
 The cause of the continuity of function of things.

However Jainism recognizes a very small measurement of time known as samaya which is an infinitely small part of a second. There are cycles (kalachakras) in it. Each cycle having two eras of equal duration described as the avasarpini and the utsarpini.

See also
Kalachakra

Mahakala
Father Time

References

Sources

 
 

Sanskrit words and phrases
Time and fate gods
Hindu philosophical concepts
Asura
Death gods